Caroline Grace-Cassidy (née Caroline Grace) is an Irish film and television actress, screenwriter, and author of seven novels. She is also known as a TV panelist.

Career
Grace's first major acting role was as Miss Mull in Custer's Last Stand Up, a BAFTA-winning children's television series, and she later acted in a range of Irish domestic and international releases, including work with Jim Sheridan.  She is best known for her role in David Gordon Green's comedy fantasy film Your Highness.  She became a full-time novelist and screenwriter in 2011.

Her debut novel, When Love Takes Over, was released by Poolbeg Press on 7 February 2012. The Irish Times newspaper named Grace-Cassidy on their list of People to Watch in 2012.  Since then she has published The Other Side Of Wonderful (2013), I Always Knew (2014), Already Taken (2015), The Week I Ruined My Life (2016), The Importance Of Being Me (2017), and Bride Squad Runaway (2019) with U.K. publishers Black & White Publishing, with The Unforeseen Love Story Of Lexie Byrne due in 2021.

Grace-Cassidy has been a regular panelist with Midday, later renamed The Elaine Show, on TV3, now Virgin Media One, since 2012.

She is a creative director at Document Films and a co-founder of the TV and film house Park Pictures. She has written eight short films: Princess Rehab (2013), Galway Fleadh-winning I AM JESUS (2014), Torn (2014), Even Droids Have Friends (2015), Cineuropa award-winning Love At First Light (2015), Blackbird (2016), Reach (2017), and Run (2019). She is the co-writer of The Quiet Woman, which is currently in development with Park Films, supported by Screen Ireland.

As of 2016, Grace-Cassidy's seventh novel, Bride Squad Runaway, was being adapted as a television drama, and a film adaptation of her fifth novel, The Week I Ruined My Life, was announced in 2017.

Personal life
Grace-Cassidy is married to Kevin, with two daughters as of 2016.

References

External links
 
 Official Facebook page

Year of birth missing (living people)
Irish television actresses
Irish film actresses
Irish writers
Living people